The Jewish Observer, founded in 1999,  is a newspaper covering Jewish religion. It is based in Encino, California, and aims to establish a lasting media relationship with readers, customers and business organizations.

This online journal seeks to serve as a forum for news information and exchange and to stir remembrance of Jewish festivals, observances and holidays. It aims to provide investigative and insightful news and examine various Jewish cultures. The paper strives to build bridges of peace among Jewry's various cultures and religious groups living in and around Los Angeles.

References

External links
Website

Jewish newspapers published in the United States